Janet Altagracia Camilo Hernández (born October 29, 1971) was the  Minister of Women's Affairs of the Dominican Republic. She was appointed by President Danilo Medina in August 2016. She is a feminist activist concerned with women's rights.

Biography
Camilo Hernández was born in Salcedo, the daughter of Antonio Manuel de Jesús Camilo and Lorenza Hernández Ramírez. She has seven siblings, a daughter, and a son. She graduated with a licentiate in law from the Universidad Nacional Pedro Henríquez Ureña, and later earned a master's degree in political science from the Universidad Autónoma de Santo Domingo.

In 1991 she joined the National Commitment movement to support José Francisco Peña Gómez of the Dominican Revolutionary Party. She held various positions within that movement.

Camilo Hernández is the President of the Latin American Institute for Women and Politics. She is a vice president of the Permanent Conference of Political Parties of Latin America and the Caribbean (COPPPAL Women). She is also vice president of Socialist International Women.

She was appointed Minister of Women's Affairs by President Danilo Medina on August 16, 2016. On February 1, 2018, she was named president pro tempore of the Council of Women's Ministers of Central America and the Dominican Republic (COMMCA).

References

External links
 
 Janet Camilo Hernández at the Ministry of Women's Affairs

1971 births
20th-century Dominican Republic lawyers
Dominican Republic women lawyers
Government ministers of the Dominican Republic
Living people
Universidad Autónoma de Santo Domingo alumni
Universidad Nacional Pedro Henríquez Ureña alumni
White Dominicans
Women government ministers of the Dominican Republic
Dominican Republic women's rights activists
21st-century Dominican Republic lawyers